Timberwood Park is a census-designated place (CDP) in far Northern Bexar County, Texas, United States and located within the southern foothills of the Texas Hill Country. The district has roughly 42 miles of roads and encompasses over 2,000 acres. The overall plan shows 3,263 platted lots. The population was 35,217 at the 2020 census, up from 13,447 at the 2010 census. It is part of the San Antonio Metropolitan Statistical Area.

Geography
Timberwood Park is a neighborhood exclusive from other separate neighborhoods that butt up to Canyon Golf Road to its east, by Deer Cross Lane and Midnight Drive to its south, Borfgeld Road to its north, and Blanco Road up to Slumber Pass on the west, with the most northwesterly border of the neighborhood encompassing only so far west as Bubbling Brook Drive, Sunny Meadow Drive, Silent Hollow, Symphonic Hill, and Streisand Street.

Climate 
Timberwood Park has a humid subtropical climate (Köppen: Cfa) featuring long, hot, and muggy summers and mild to cool winters. The area is subject to descending northern cold fronts and arctic fronts in the winter with cool to cold nights, typically seeing night lows at or near freezing and is cool to warm and rainy in the spring and fall. The area can also be subject to fairly regular ice and snow storms, with the most recent snowstorm dumping between 9-10 inches of snow between February 14th and 18th in 2021  and the most recent ice storm depositing nearly a quarter inch of ice on February 1, 2023.

Timberwood Park falls in USDA hardiness zone 8b (15 °F to 20 °F).

Timberwood Park observes an average of 19 subfreezing nights each year. The area also sees an average of 20 100°F+ days each summer, but some years feature none (2021) or may suffer through up to 50 (2022).

Demographics

As of the 2020 United States census, there were 35,217 people, 7,513 households, and 6,069 families residing in the CDP.

As of the census of 2000, there were 5,889 people, 2,002 households, and 1,721 families residing in the CDP. The population density was 309.5 people per square mile (119.5/km2). There were 2,065 housing units at an average density of 108.5/sq mi (41.9/km2). The racial makeup of the CDP was 90.25% White, 1.10% African American, 0.46% Native American, 1.09% Asian, 4.33% from other races, and 2.77% from two or more races. Hispanic or Latino of any race were 20.26% of the population. The area submitted a petition signed by more than 4,100 residents to the City of San Antonio seeking immediate annexation - a ploy to get permission from the Texas Legislature to incorporate under Texas Statutory law.

There were 2,002 households, out of which 44.7% had children under the age of 18 living with them, 78.2% were married couples living together, 5.6% had a female householder with no husband present, and 14.0% were non-families. 11.4% of all households were made up of individuals, and 2.8% had someone living alone who was 65 years of age or older. The average household size was 2.94 and the average family size was 3.18.

In the CDP, the population was spread out, with 29.4% under the age of 18, 5.4% from 18 to 24, 31.5% from 25 to 44, 27.5% from 45 to 64, and 6.2% who were 65 years of age or older. The median age was 38 years. For every 100 females, there were 100.2 males. For every 100 females age 18 and over, there were 96.7 males.

The median income for a household in the CDP was $79,053, and the median income for a family was $83,203. Males had a median income of $52,196 versus $36,761 for females. The per capita income for the CDP was $34,385. About 1.8% of families and 3.4% of the population were below the poverty line, including 5.5% of those under age 18 and 5.6% of those age 65 or over.

Politically, Timberwood Park is one of the most conservative regions of Bexar County and voted for Donald Trump in 2016 and 2020 by large margins.

Education
Timberwood Park is served by the Comal Independent School District, and North East Independent School District.

The CISD portion is assigned to:
 Timberwood Park, Specht, and Kinder Ranch elementary schools
 Most residents are in the Spring Branch Middle School zone, with some in the Smithson Valley Middle zone. Pieper Ranch Middle School also serves the area.
 Smithson Valley High School until Pieper High School opened in 2021.

The NEISD portion is assigned to:
 Tuscany Heights Elementary School
 Portions zoned to Bush Middle School and Tejeda Middle School
 Portions zoned to Ronald Reagan High School and Lady Bird Johnson High School

History of schools
Previously areas in Timberwood Park in NEISD had Oak Meadow Elementary as the overflow school.

Roan Forest Elementary previously served sections of the NEISD portion.

Reagan previously served all of the NEISD portion. After Johnson opened, portions of Timberwood Park were reassigned to Johnson.

References 

Census-designated places in Bexar County, Texas
Census-designated places in Texas
Greater San Antonio